Gilbert Layton (November 5, 1899 – May 29, 1961) was a Canadian politician and businessman in Quebec, Canada.

Background 
Born in Montreal, Quebec, Layton, the son of Philip Edward David Layton and Alice Marion Gilbert, was a merchant and business executive in the family firm of Layton Brothers (founded 1887, now as Layton Audio) from 1918 to 1932. His father was a blind activist who led a campaign for disability pensions in the 1930s. Gilbert married Norah Lestelle England (daughter of Arthur John England and Florence Louise Grimmett) on February 18, 1921.

Member of the legislature 
Gilbert Layton was elected to Quebec's legislative assembly in the riding of Montréal–Saint-Georges in 1936 as a member of the Union Nationale, a conservative party. He served as minister without portfolio in the government of Maurice Duplessis until resigning in 1939 to protest the Quebec government's opposition to conscription in World War II. He ran for re-election to the legislature as an independent candidate that year and was defeated.

Federal politics 
In the 1945 federal election, he ran as an Independent Progressive Conservative for the Mount Royal seat in the House of Commons of Canada, but was defeated. He placed fourth behind the Liberal victor, the official Progressive Conservative Party of Canada candidate and the Co-operative Commonwealth Federation (CCF) candidate.

Death 
Layton died in Montreal and is buried at Mount Royal Cemetery.

Descendants 

Gilbert Layton's son, Robert Layton, served as a federal Progressive Conservative cabinet minister in the 1980s. His grandson, Jack Layton, was the leader of the federal New Democratic Party from 2003 to 2011, and was Leader of the Official Opposition for a short time in 2011 until he died in office. His great-grandson is Toronto City Councillor Mike Layton.

References 
 

1899 births
1961 deaths
Businesspeople from Montreal
Independent candidates in the 1945 Canadian federal election
Gilbert Layton
Politicians from Montreal
Union Nationale (Quebec) MNAs
Burials at Mount Royal Cemetery